Izvorul Gropii may refer to:

 Izvorul Gropii, a tributary of the Lotru in Vâlcea County
 Izvorul Gropii, a tributary of the Bâsculița in Buzău County

See also 
 Groapa (disambiguation)